Conan the Conqueror may refer to:

 Conan the Barbarian, the fictional character created by Robert E. Howard, also known as "Conan the Conqueror"
 Conan the Conqueror (1987 film), cancelled sequel to the 1984 film "Conan the Destroyer"
 Conan the Conqueror (2017 film), cancelled sequel to the 1982 film "Conan the Barbarian"
 The Hour of the Dragon (1950 novel) novel by Robert E. Howard, also published as "Conan the Conqueror"
 King Conan: The Conqueror (2014 comics) comic book series, see Conan (Dark Horse Comics)

See also
 Kull the Conqueror (1997 film) film derived from the script of the cancelled 1987 film "Conan the Conqueror"
 The Conquering Sword of Conan (2005 anthology) story collection of Robert E. Howard's Conan works
 Conan the Unconquered (1983 novel) novel by Robert Jordan

 Conan the Destroyer (disambiguation)
 Conan the Barbarian (disambiguation)
 Conan the Cimmerian (disambiguation)
 Conan the Adventurer (disambiguation)
 Conan (disambiguation)
 Conqueror (disambiguation)